Gallerucida is a genus of skeletonizing leaf beetles in the family Chrysomelidae. There are at least 19 described species in Gallerucida. They are found in Indomalaya and eastern Asia.

Species
These 19 species belong to the genus Gallerucida:
 Gallerucida apicipennis (Duvivier, 1885)
 Gallerucida apurvella Yang, 1994
 Gallerucida asticha Yang, 1997
 Gallerucida basalis Chen, 1992
 Gallerucida bifasciata Motschulsky, 1860 (Japanese knotweed leaf beetle)
 Gallerucida chunia Maulik, 1936
 Gallerucida erythroptera Yang, 1992
 Gallerucida flavipennis (Solsky, 1872)
 Gallerucida flaviventris (Baly, 1861)
 Gallerucida gebieni Weise, 1922
 Gallerucida gloriosa (Baly, 1861)
 Gallerucida lutea Gressitt & Kimoto, 1969
 Gallerucida nigropicta (Fairmaire, 1888)
 Gallerucida ornatipennis (Duvivier, 1885)
 Gallerucida sauteri Chujo, 1938
 Gallerucida shirozui Kimoto, 1969
 Gallerucida singularis (Harold, 1880)
 Gallerucida thoracica (Jacoby, 1888)
 Gallerucida tibialis (Laboissiere, 1931)

References

External links

 

Galerucinae
Chrysomelidae genera
Taxa named by Victor Motschulsky